Cassani is an Italian surname. Notable people with the surname include:

Barbara Cassani (born 1960), American businesswoman
Davide Cassani (born 1961), Italian cyclist
Joseph Cassani (1673–1750), Spanish historian
Mattia Cassani (born 1983), Italian footballer
Valerio Cassani (1922–1995), Italian footballer

Italian-language surnames